Farum station is the terminus of the Hareskovbanen radial of the S-train network around Copenhagen, Denmark. It is located about 1 km east of the old village Farum, but is the center of the modern Farum, which has grown up around the station.

History

The station opened in 1906 as an intermediate station on the Copenhagen-Slangerup railway. The line between Farum and Slangerup closed in 1954. The station was remodeled completely prior to the line's conversion to S-trains in 1977.

See also
 List of railway stations in Denmark

References

External links

S-train (Copenhagen) stations
Railway stations opened in 1906
1906 establishments in Denmark
Farum
Railway stations in Denmark opened in the 20th century